Mokhtar Megueni (born July 24, 1989 in Mascara) is a retired Algerian footballer.

Club career
On July 19, 2010, Megueni was loaned out by ES Sétif to MC Saïda for one season.

International career
In September 2007, Megueni was called up to the Algerian U20 National Team for the first edition of the Mediterranean Trophy held in Sicily, Italy. In 2008, he was a member of the U20 team that drew 0-0 with Mauritania in the preliminary round of the 2009 African Youth Championship.

In 2008, Megueni was called up to the Algerian Under-23 National Team for a five-day training camp in Algiers. Since then, he has been a regular member of the Under-23 team. On April 29, 2011, he scored his first goal for the Under-23 team, with a goal in the 20th minute in a 1-0 win over Niger.

Honours
 ES Sétif
 Algerian Cup: 2011–12

References

External links
 DZFoot Profile
 

1989 births
Living people
People from Mascara, Algeria
Algerian footballers
Algerian Ligue Professionnelle 1 players
ES Sétif players
MC Saïda players
Algeria under-23 international footballers
Algeria youth international footballers
JSM Béjaïa players
Association football defenders
21st-century Algerian people